Ingemar Harald Robert Hedberg (8 March 1920 – 19 May 2019) was a Swedish sprint canoeist who competed in the early 1950s. He won the silver medal in the K-2 1000 m event at the 1952 Summer Olympics in Helsinki. Hedberg also won three gold medals at the 1950 ICF Canoe Sprint World Championships in Copenhagen, earning them in the K-1 4×500 m, K-2 500 m, and K-2 1000 m events. He died in May 2019 at the age of 99.

References

External links

1920 births
2019 deaths
Canoeists at the 1952 Summer Olympics
ICF Canoe Sprint World Championships medalists in kayak
Olympic canoeists of Sweden
Olympic medalists in canoeing
Olympic silver medalists for Sweden
Swedish male canoeists

Medalists at the 1952 Summer Olympics
Sportspeople from Örebro